was a Japanese radical leftist and terrorist. He was born in Osaka and entered the Osaka City University. After some members of the Red Army were arrested by the Japanese police while he escaped from them, several members of the group went to North Korea with Japan Airlines Flight 351 and some formed the Japanese Red Army. He eventually became the leader of the United Red Army. Along with Hiroko Nagata, he allegedly killed 12 members and he was arrested in February 1972. He committed suicide by hanging in his cell in Tokyo on 1 January 1973.

References

1944 births
1973 suicides
People from Osaka
Japanese activists
Japanese Marxists
Suicides by hanging in Japan
Japanese people who died in prison custody
Prisoners who died in Japanese detention
Japanese communists
People who committed suicide in prison custody